The 1914 Nebraska Cornhuskers football team represented the University of Nebraska in the 1914 college football season. The team was coached by fourth-year head coach Ewald O. Stiehm and played its home games at Nebraska Field in Lincoln, Nebraska. They competed as members of the Missouri Valley Conference. The 1914 season was part of Nebraska's 34-game unbeaten streak that ran from 1912 to 1916.

Schedule

Coaching staff

Roster

Game summaries

Washburn

Sources:

South Dakota

Sources:

After a three-year break, South Dakota arrived in Lincoln to resume their series with Nebraska. Several South Dakota players allegedly used a loophole which allowed them to play for the Coyotes for six or seven seasons by moving out-of-state in the offseason; therefore, many of South Dakota's players had faced the Cornhuskers four years prior. The game ended in a scoreless draw.

at Kansas State

Sources:

Michigan Agricultural

Sources:

This was the first game between Nebraska and Michigan Agricultural, which would later become Michigan State.

Iowa State

Sources:

Morningside

Sources:

This was the only meeting between Morningside and Nebraska.

Kansas

Sources:

at Iowa

Sources:

References

Nebraska
Nebraska Cornhuskers football seasons
Missouri Valley Conference football champion seasons
College football undefeated seasons
Nebraska Cornhuskers football